Sunita Dulal (Nepali: सुनिता दुलाल; born 28 November 1991) is a prominent Nepalese folk singer from Kathmandu, Nepal (born in Jalbire, Sindhulpalchok District). She has been singing Nepali folk, festive to modern songs for the last ten years.  Sunita Dulal is a multitalented young Nepali woman. In addition to singing, Sunita Dulal also does acting, presents program on NTV (Nepal Television, a state television channel), and modeling as well. Recently, she has released her 13th album Mero Hajur on market which reflects to be another super hit Nepalese Teej Festive album of her. Teej festival normally falls from late July to early September. Sunita Dulal has now released her this year's Teej Album ''Nachau Sarara'; which is her 15th album including songs 'Teej Ko Ayo Lahara' and 'Chuppa Moi Khaula'.
She also participated in Melancholy, an environmental song by 365 Nepalese artists in which break Guinness World Record entitled "Most Vocal Solos in a Song Recording" is written, music composed and directed by Nipesh DHAKA. On 19 May 2016, Dulal recorded her solo part with her group at Radio Nepal studio and officially released in 2 September 2017 by president Bidya Devi Bhandari at Army Officer's Club, Kathmandu.

Life and career
Sunita Dulal was born in Jalbire, Sindhulpalchok District, of Central Nepal. She completed her schooling from Golden Bright Future Boarding School and Shree Anand Secondary School in Jalbire, Sindhupalchwok. After completion of her higher education, she moved to Kathmandu for further study. She then achieved her bachelor's degree in Humanities from Padma Kanya Campus, Kathmandu, Nepal. Sunita Dulal entered into the music industry at a young age. She has recorded more than 100 Nepali Folk songs. She has been brought up in a musically nurtured family. Sunita Dulal says, “I remember how my teachers and seniors would make me sing and dance when I was only in class three,” who is a great fan of Aruna Lama She also refers to her mother as one of her major influences on her singing career. Some of Sunita Dulal's best songs include ‘आमाले पकाको मिठो खाना‘, ‘अब त मैले नी झुम्का लगाउछु‘, ‘उनको लागी ब्रत बसेको‘ and ‘मेरै दीलमा फुल्यौ निरमाया .  She likes to travel and explore new places. She has traveled across the US, Europe, South Korea, Japan, Malaysia, Hong Kong, and several Middle East countries.

Personal life
Sunita Dulal is currently focused on her career. She hasn't made up her mind about marriage life. She is planning to get married in few years.

Awards and recognitions
 2012 ’Singer of The Year 2012’ Nepali Songs TV
 2011 ‘Best Female Folk Singer’ - Hetauda FM 96.6
 2011 ‘Certificate of Appreciation’ Embassy of Nepal in USA
 2011 ‘Top 5 Folk Singers of The Year’ – Kantipur FM
 2009  Best Female Folk singer of the year award by Hetauda FM 96.6
 2009 Special Recognition by Paurakhi Group Syangja Samaj, Qatar

References

External links
 
 

Living people
Nepalese folk singers
21st-century Nepalese women singers
People from Sindhupalchowk District
Dohori singers
Padma Kanya Multiple Campus alumni
Tribhuvan University alumni
1971 births